Secrecy is power/progressive metal group from Bremen, Germany. Founded in 1987, they notably released two albums on Noise Records.

Discography
 Like Burning One's Boats (demo, 1988)
 Art in Motion (1990, Noise Records)
 Raging Romance (1991, Noise Records)
 Set the Sails (demo, 1992)

References

German power metal musical groups
German progressive metal musical groups
Culture in Bremen (city)
Musical groups established in 1987
Noise Records artists